The 1901 Melbourne Cup was a two-mile handicap horse race which took place on Tuesday, 5 November 1901.

This year was the forty-first running of the Melbourne Cup.

This is the list of placegetters for the 1901 Melbourne Cup.

See also

 Melbourne Cup
 List of Melbourne Cup winners
 Victoria Racing Club

References

External links
1901 Melbourne Cup footyjumpers.com

1901
Melbourne Cup
Melbourne Cup
20th century in Melbourne
1900s in Melbourne